Il Prof. Dott. Guido Tersilli, primario della clinica Villa Celeste, convenzionata con le mutue is a 1969 Italian comedy film directed by Luciano Salce.

It is the sequel of Be Sick... It's Free.

Plot 
Former family physician Guido Tersilli has advanced the career ladder through unethical means and is now the head of private clinic Villa Celeste in Rome. The clinic was built by Tersilli on his mother's advice and with financial backing from his father-in-law, who purchased the land from an order of nuns. As director, Tersilli enforces an aggressive penny-pinching policy, prioritizing wealthy patients over those on social health insurance, filling the clinic to capacity through unnecessary surgery, and constantly recycling food and supplies.

To increase the reputation of Villa Celeste, Tersilli hires renowned surgeon Gustavo Azzarini to perform the more complex operations. Azzarini's greed and cynicism surpass even Tersilli's — going as far as to stand idle in the surgery room until his check clears — but his excellent skill and superstar antics give the clinic the prestige sought. One night, while Tersilli is having an extramarital affair with a young patient's mother, her child undergoes emergency surgery at the hands of Dr. Cremona, a young, brilliant yet underappreciated surgeon in the Villa Celeste ranks. Realizing Cremona's potential and intending to get rid of Azzarini's cumbersome persona, Tersilli gradually passes his operations over to Cremona, despite making patients believe they were operated by Azzarini and still charging them with Azzarini's fee. When he learns of this, Azzarini is outraged: he severs ties with Tersilli and hires Cremona as his own assistant.

After attending a party at Tersilli's house, where they realized the extent of his wealth, the clinic staff march into Tersilli's office and demand better working conditions, pay raises and actual employment contracts. When Tersilli refuses, the staff resign and most patients consequently walk out of the clinic. Faced with having to operate on a renal colic to one of the last remaining patients, Tersilli, who lacks any surgical skills, begs his wife to intercede with Azzarini, since he has been suspecting an affair between them. Tersilli's former team, led by Azzarini, arrive at the last minute and save the day, but charge a hefty fee and leave immediately afterwards.

Alone and on the brink of closure, Tersilli is convinced by his mother that real profit comes from "healing the healthy". He therefore converts Villa Celeste into a cosmetic surgery and rejuvenation clinic, dropping all contracts with health insurances and bringing his business back to profitability.

Cast 

 Alberto Sordi: Guido Tersilli 
 Ida Galli: Anna Maria Tersilli 
 Pupella Maggio: Antonietta Parisi 
 Claudio Gora: Prof. De Amatis  
 Alessandro Cutolo: Valentano 
 Ira von Fürstenberg: Dr. Olivieri
 Nanda Primavera: Mother of Guido
 Claudia Giannotti: Dr. Natoli
 Sandro Merli: Dr. Drufo 
 Sandro Dori: Dr. Zucconi 
 Antonella Della Porta: Mrs. Fabiani  
 Laura De Marchi: Nurse 
 Lino Banfi: Pharmaceutical sales representative 
 Marco Tulli: Doorman

References

External links

1971 films
Italian comedy films
1971 comedy films
Films directed by Luciano Salce
Medical-themed films
Italian sequel films
1970s Italian-language films
1970s Italian films